Henry of Anjou may refer to:

 Henry II of England, Count of Anjou from 1133 to his death in 1189
 Henry III of France, Duke of Anjou from 1551 to his death in 1589